Northern Mariana Islands men's national softball team is the national team for the Northern Mariana Island. The team competed at the 1992 ISF Men's World Championship in Manila, Philippines where they finished with 1 win and 8 losses. The team competed at the 1996 ISF Men's World Championship in Midland, Michigan where they finished with 3 wins and 7 losses.

References

Men's national softball teams
softball
Men's sports in the Northern Mariana Islands
Softball in the Northern Mariana Islands